White House Gift Shop is a gift shop that was founded on 9 September 1946 during the Truman administration. Originally named the White House Flower Fund, the gift shop is now privately owned and has no connection with the White House and is not associated with the US federal government. The headquarters have been located at Lititz, Pennsylvania since 2012.

References

External links 

 

1950 establishments in the United States
American companies established in 1950
Lititz, Pennsylvania
Privately held companies of the United States